Lady Gangster is a 1942 Warner Bros. B picture crime film directed by Robert Florey, credited as "Florian Roberts". It is based on the play Gangstress, or Women in Prison by Dorothy Mackaye, who in 1928, as #440960, served less than ten months of a one- to three-year sentence in San Quentin State Prison. Lady Gangster is a remake of the pre-Code film, Ladies They Talk About (1933).  Jackie Gleason plays a supporting role.

Plot
Dorothy "Dot" Burton (Faye Emerson) is a member of a gang of bank robbers. Using her femininity and a cute dog provided her by her male cohorts, who dognapped him, she is able to enter a bank before opening time, leaving the door open and the bank guard holding her dog, thus enabling a successful robbery. When police interfere with the getaway, she faints and proclaims her innocence, but the police  have strong doubts as "her" dog will not come to her and has a different name on his collar from what she calls him. After she confesses to her part in the robbery, she is sent to women's prison, where she makes an enemy of a fellow inmate who informs the governor that Burton knows where the bank's money is, thereby causing Burton to lose her parole. She is devastated by it but more trouble occurs as her old gang is going to kill her childhood sweetheart Ken Philips (Frank Wilcox), so she escapes by stealing the warden’s (Virginia Brissac) clothes and getting revenge on her rival inmate (Ruth Ford) before finally rescuing Ken.

Cast
 Faye Emerson as Dorothy Drew Burton
 Julie Bishop as Myrtle Reed
 Frank Wilcox as Kenneth Phillips
 Roland Drew as Carey Wells
 Jackie Gleason as Wilson (as Jackie C. Gleason)
 Ruth Ford as Lucy Fenton
 Virginia Brissac as Mrs. Stoner
 Dorothy Vaughan as Matron Jenkins
 Dorothy Adams as Deaf Annie
 William Hopper as John (as DeWitt Hopper)
 Vera Lewis as Ma Silsby
 Herbert Rawlinson as Lewis Sinton
 Charles C. Wilson as Detective
 Frank Mayo as Walker
 Leah Baird as Matron
 Jack Mower as Police Sergeant

Soundtrack
 "Blues in the Night" (Music by Harold Arlen)

References

External links 

 
 
 
 
 Lady Gangster at Internet Archive

1942 films
Warner Bros. films
1942 crime drama films
1940s English-language films
American black-and-white films
American crime drama films
American films based on plays
American prison drama films
Films directed by Robert Florey
Women in prison films
1940s American films